The Adventures of Sanmao the Waif (also known as The Winter of Three Hairs, Wanderings of Three-Hairs the Orphan or An Orphan on the Streets) (三毛流浪记) is a 1949 Chinese film released by Kunlun Film Company, directed by Zhao Ming and Yan Gong. The 1949 film is based on the Sanmao comic, created by Zhang Leping in 1935 and features the well-known Chinese cultural symbol of child poverty, Sanmao (meaning "three hairs"), a homeless orphan boy. The film, which stars Wang Longji, follows Sanmao through his adventures surviving and meeting new people on the streets of Shanghai. The film notably works to counterbalance the tragic story of Sanmao with humour and comedy. Sanmao's visual image of a small boy with a big head and three hairs is well-known amongst Chinese people both old and young.

Plot
The film begins in Old Shanghai with a homeless orphan named Sanmao (Three Hairs). Constantly battling hunger and coldness, he sleeps in garbage carts and eats anything he can find. He tries to mimic the actions of other homeless children, earning money by selling newspapers and picking up cigarette butts. However, without any parents or a family, he has no one to teach him how to survive or succeed.

Sanmao comes across a group of street urchins who - after an initial fight - take him in and look out for him, while working together. The little earnings that he manages to make still have to be given to their “Little Boss.” Though Sanmao finds camaraderie and friendship with the group of homeless children, he still envies the children who can attend school and who have parents who will buy anything for them. However he stays optimistic and resilient, and works hard.

On Children’s Day, Sanmao is intrigued by celebratory parades in the street. He hears announcers shouting that children are the future of the nation and claiming that all children should have rights to good health, education, warmth, comfort and should be loved, protected, and respected. But ironically Sanmao and his homeless friends are beaten and chased away from the celebration by policemen when they attempt to join the Boy Scouts marching in the parade.

One day Sanmao is blamed for stealing a wallet that he found and was trying to return, but he is saved by the “Big Boss.” Big Boss convinces Sanmao to work for him with Big Boss’s other “apprentices” as a pickpocket. Sanmao feels guilty after stealing his first wallet and returns it to the owner, but he is thrown into a cell by the gang and left there for three days without food. Afterwards, the Big Boss and his wife dress Sanmao as if he were their son and take him to a department store to shoplift material. Upon being caught, they run away, leaving Sanmao behind. Sanmao escapes the pursuing shopkeepers and returns to the streets. Unable to continue living on the street, Sanmao tries to sell himself (at a far lower price than a doll pictured in a toy-shop window) and is bought by a selfish rich woman who wants to adopt a son. Sanmao is renamed "Tom" and he is given etiquette classes to prepare him for the upcoming celebration of his adoption (which takes place in November 1948). But Sanmao doesn’t want to become a prim, proper, and obedient “son”. On the night of the celebration, Sanmao goes outside to have a moment alone, and he sees his homeless friends outside the gates. They're hungry and he lets them in to give them food. The homeless children overrun the party, which comes to a chaotic end, and Sanmao flees the lavish home along with the other boys.

Sanmao returns to his harsh life, but is at least free on the streets. His days continue as before, until the Communist victory in China's civil war in October 1949. Sanmao and his homeless friends encounter the parade in the streets of Shanghai, with hordes of locals celebrating the liberation. The people march in the streets, carry banners of the Chinese Communist Party leaders’ faces, and shout, “Long live Chairman Mao!” Countless homeless orphans like Sanmao join the march on the street and dance and celebrate.

Cast
 Sanmao (Three Hairs): Wang Longji 
 Little Boss: Ding Ran
 Big Boss: Guan Hongda
 Rich Wife: Lin Zhen
 Rich Husband: Du Lei
 Little Ox: Wang Gongxu
 Auntie: Huang Chen
 Lao San: Yang Shaoqiao

Release and Screen

Inspiration and Development

The film is based on the 1947 cartoon series of the same title. The series was created and authored by Zhang Leping, one of the most-well-known cartoonists of modern China as well as vice president and active member of the Cartoon Propaganda Corps (a group of popular Chinese cartoonists who used their art to rally citizens during the outbreak of war with Japan). Zhang began publicizing his comic series in the Shanghai daily newspaper, Shen Bao, in 1935 where it immediately garnered attention from the public. Zhang's serial comic ran in the paper during and after World War II for a total of 12 years. The left-leaning cartoonist often used his drawings to portray inequality in China between the lower classes and the elites and brought attention to child poverty with his illustrations. Director Zhao Ming also sourced Charlie Chaplin's films as inspiration for The Adventures of Sanmao the Waif, with the goal being to make the movie enjoyable for educated and uneducated people.

The film was produced and developed by Kunlun Film Company, a Shanghai company founded in May 1947 and established as a replacement for Lianhua Film Company which previously shut down due to extensive interference of the National Party. Having released several left-leaning themed films before 1949, Kunlun Film Company’s engagement in the production of The Adventures of Sanmao the Waif confirmed that the movie would implement politically-charged content. Left-wing screenwriter and movie director, Yang Hansheng, developed the initial script for the film but director Zhao Ming changed much of it, believing that Yang’s script was too dramatic and divergent from Zhang Leping’s original comic strips. Zhao Ming mentioned that he aimed to create a balance between light-hearted, humorous tones and the serious, tragic events that Sanmao experiences.

The 1949 film extends and continues Sanmao’s adventures after the end of Zhang Leping’s comic-strip. With development beginning in October 1948, the film's release was originally planned for release in the same year, however it was banned by Guomindang. In the initial stages of the film’s production, Zhao Ming received, presumably from Guomindang, which read, “If Sanmao carries on, you will have to watch your head.” Zhang Leping, who actively participated in the film’s production received the same message a few days later. It was cleared for screening only after the People's Liberation Army took over Shanghai in October 1949. During this delay, a scene was added in which Sanmao experiences a turn of fortune concurrent with the political change. The director explains in his memoirs that the new ending was produced in haste, in the fervor of Shanghai's liberation and in the wake of shifting political circumstances in China. Premiering in December 1949, The Adventures of Sanmao the Waif became one of the first feature films to be screened after the creation of the People's Republic of China.

The ending parade scene reconstructs the Shanghai's liberation parade and seamlessly blends in with footage from the actual liberation parade that took place before the film was released. The documentary shots are shown through Sanmao’s point of view.

Theme
Zhang Leping, the author of the original source comic which inspired the 1949 film, The Adventures of Sanmao the Waif, aimed to satirize and call out the apathetic actions and attitude towards child poverty that was held by many people during the 1930s and 1940s. Though the homeless character was not a new theme at this time, Zhang created a child character who retains his innocence and sense of moral justice despite his unfortunate circumstances. Sanmao’s innocent optimism and sense of justice are large themes in The Adventures of Sanmao the Waif, seen in Sanmao’s desire to go to school or when he returns the wallet after pickpocketing it.

The Adventures of Sanmao the Waif shows the lives of orphans, the “wandering children”, who struggle to survive on the streets in 1940s Shanghai. It highlights the inequality among children in the 1940s when Sanmao and his orphans friends are not able to enjoy the joy of celebrating Children’s day with the richer children, despite the slogan "Children are the protagonists of the state's future! We must cherish the children and respect them!" In this scene, Sanmao wants to join the Boy Scout parade and prompts his homeless friends to join them, but unfortunately, they are chased away by the police. This scene alludes to the irony of China’s supposed policies of protecting and supporting all children, as the reality is that homeless children of lower classes are shunned from public celebrations and discriminated against by police officers. The Children’s Day parade scene is the essence of comedy as well as an important opportunity for the character development of Sanmao. Zhao Ming affirmed this scene as crucial to the plot of the film. Ultimately, the film and this scene especially critique the Nationalist government’s inability to adequately support poorer children as well as bring attention to the tendency for impoverished children to be treated much more negatively than children of wealthier backgrounds.

The last parade scene where a dancer invites Sanmao and other vagrant children to leave the sidelines and join in the celebration, contrasts with the earlier Children's Day parade scene where Sanmao and his friends are chased away and beaten by the police after attempting to join the marching Boy Scouts. This contrast implies that the Old Society rejects this group of homeless youths, while New China embraces them. This ending scene of the film diverges from Zhang Leping’s original serial comic in that it introduces overt support for the Chinese Communist Party, turning the character of Sanmao into a symbol of political liberation and social justice.

Background
The creator of the original 1935 Sanmao comic, Zhang Leping, originated from a humble background, in which his education included only a few years of elementary school. He gained experience as an apprentice in Shanghai later in his life and also was able to take courses at a professional school. Sources of Zhang’s thought process when writing and creating the Sanmao series could be found in the prefaces of his comic strips. These introductions gave valuable insight into the political thought of Zhang as well as the goals he wished to achieve with the Sanmao comics. Unlike cartoonists such as Feng Zikai, Zhang did not keep diaries or essays about his artistic work, making the introductions of his comic strips vital to the understanding of his work.

Zhang Leping also displayed his skillful thought and artistic ideas through his contribution to published debates about comic art in specialized magazines. His son, Zhang Weijun, along with other of Leping’s family members collected pictures, documents and the original Sanmao picture story books, which they made available to the public on the official Sanmao website. In recognition of his works, the Zhang Leping Memorial Hall was built in 1995 in the artist’s hometown of Haiyan 海鹽, in which guests are able to visit the original physical pieces and art.

Since 1949, because of the political and revolutionary backgrounds in contemporary China, almost all the films had been produced among six major motifs: 1) praise and loyalty to Mao and the Communist Party, 2) revolution and class struggle, 3) comparison between the new and old society, 4) heroes and models, 5) love and family ties, and 6) backwardness and progress. In fact, the latter five motifs were all serving the first one, praise and loyalty to Mao and the Communist Party. It was this idea that raised patriotism and nationalism to an unprecedented level of height, and formulated absolute standards in the political sense for the other five motifs. The Adventures of Sanmao the Waif, however, was one of the less than 10 films produced in 17 years since 1949 that didn’t praise Mao and the party and didn’t explicitly show loyalty. The Communist Party of China perhaps interpreted the film, The Adventures of Sanmao the Waif, as implicitly opposing the party, which is suggested when Sanmao takes off his new clothing from his new family and leaves them behind.

The initial two versions of the film's ending didn’t feature the celebration of liberation. It was after May 1949 when Shanghai was liberated that Xia Yan, Director of the Art Department of Shanghai Military Management Committee, recommended adding the celebration parade that featured portraits of Mao Zedong and Zhu De. This new ending adds to the political meaning of "reunion" in addition to humor in this film

Critical reception

The Adventures of Sanmao the Waif is an exemplary film that combines time and arts. It was released in 1949 and received both domestic and international acclaim. The film portrays a lively character in an environment with sharp social contradictions. The film criticizes the injustice and cruelty towards the poor in the old society, and meanwhile extols the “Sanmao Spirit” of being strong, kind, optimistic, warm, and humorous even when facing a miserable fate and under a helpless and miserable circumstance. The film contains some distinctive characteristics of the time and represents the consciousness that’s often found on left-wing writers.

Though the film accuses the unjust reality of the old society, it is expressed through the form of comedy. Many scenes in the film are exaggerated, and the power of this film comes largely from this kind of over-exaggeration. For example, the famous sequence where the rich lady holds a party for Sanmao but Sanmao causes a farce with a group of homeless kids, is shadowing resistance against social norms in the old society. Unlike the film Myriad of Lights which uses strict realism and tragedy to reveal the miserable destiny of the lower class, The Adventures of Sanmao the Waif adopts the form of romantic exaggerated comedy to express this theme.

The film not only appealed to its target audience of children but its commentary on social issues appealed to adults as well. The film was most popular as it drew crowds in from Hong Kong and Paris in as late as 1981. This phenomenon was termed by Voice of America as “a Sanmao Craze.” Paired with a nostalgia for Shanghai, the craze inspired several remakes in mainland China, of which included Sanmao Runs a Business (Huang Zuolin, 1958), and Sanmao Joins the Army (Zhang Jianya, 1992).

After the Cultural Revolution in China, there was great interest in Chinese cinema from the late 1970s to the early 1980s. In order to draw attention to these films, Europe began screening Chinese films. Jean Florenzano bought the distribution rights to The Adventures of Sanmao the Waif and four other films including Street Angel (Yuan Muzhi, 1937), Crossroads (Shen Xiling, 1937), The Monkey King (Wan Laiming, 1961), and Troubled Laughter (Yang Yanjin, 1979) to help bring more exposure to Chinese cinema. The Adventures of Sanmao the Waif was screened at the Cannes Film Festival in 1981, as part of a special program, “Images Du Cinema Chinois”, that highlighted the shift of Chinese cultural politics towards an international market. The film was also screened at the International Film Festival Rotterdam in 1987.

Awards

In 1983, the film won the Jury Award at the 12th Figueira Da Foz International Film Festival of Portugal.

In 1984, the film won The Special Mention Award at the 14th Giffoni International Film Festival of Italy.

References

External links

Wanderings of Three Hairs the Orphan 三毛流浪記 (1949) with English subtitles on Youtube published by Modern Chinese Cultural Studies

1949 films
Films based on Chinese comics
Chinese black-and-white films
Chinese comedy-drama films
1949 comedy-drama films